Nick Kellington is a British actor and musician. He is best known for his roles in children's television series, the new Star Wars films and The Dark Crystal: Age of Resistance. His television acting career began in 2007, when he portrayed Igglepiggle in the CBeebies show In the Night Garden....

In 2010 he played Tang in "ZingZillas" also for CBeebies and in 2015, he took on the role of Dipsy in the reboot of Teletubbies, previously portrayed by John Simmit before it went into a 14-year hiatus. He will later reprise his role as Dipsy in the upcoming Netflix reboot of Teletubbies.

Kellington appeared in the 2016 Star Wars film Rogue One as Bistan, a Rebel Alliance gunner.

He also appears in 2017's Star Wars: The Last Jedi as Snook Uccorfay, a mole-like playboy in the casino city of Canto Bight.

In 2018, Kellington played Ned the Neanderthal in the two-part documentary series Neanderthals : Meet Your Ancestors, presented by Ella Al-Shamahi and broadcast on BBC4 in May 2018. A VixPix Films production in association with Imaginarium Productions and the BBC.

In 2019, he appeared in The Dark Crystal: Age of Resistance as the creature suit performer providing the body movements for skekMal/The Hunter, one of the Skeksis new to the series.

Kellington played cornet and ukulele in the rock band Ella Guru.

Filmography
In the Night Garden... (2007-2009), Igglepiggle 
Doctor Who (2008), Sontaran warrior
ZingZillas (2010-2012), Tang
Strange Hill High (2012), senior puppeteer
Muppets Most Wanted (2014), UK additional Muppet performer (uncredited)
Teletubbies (2015-2018), Dipsy
Rogue One: A Star Wars Story (2016), Bistan
Star Wars: The Last Jedi (2017), Snook Uccorfay
Neanderthals : Meet Your Ancestors (2018), Ned
Solo: A Star Wars Story (2018), puppeteer
Slaughterhouse Rulez" (2018), Monster and protestorThe Dark Crystal: Age of Resistance (2019), SkekMal / The HunterStar Wars: The Rise of Skywalker'' (2019), Klaud

References

External links

Living people
British male actors
English people of Asian descent
Year of birth missing (living people)